Orlando Ortiz Chevres (born April 21, 1978) is a Puerto Rican politician and the current mayor of Naranjito. Ortiz is affiliated with the New Progressive Party (PNP) and has served as mayor since 2009. 

Graduated from Francisco Morales high school in Naranjito. In 2003 he obtained a masters degree in administration and human resources from the Interamerican University of Puerto Rico. 

Ortiz is also serves in the Puerto Rico National Guard since 2005. In February 2020 he obtained the certification in "Financial Management Technician 36b" at the Fort Knox Kentucky, USA, where he specialized in finance.

References

Living people
Interamerican University of Puerto Rico alumni
Mayors of places in Puerto Rico
New Progressive Party (Puerto Rico) politicians
People from Naranjito, Puerto Rico
Puerto Rico National Guard personnel
1978 births